There is a long history of women in dentistry.

Timeline

16th century
 Unknown, 16th century: In an early copper engraving by Lucas Van Leyden, a traveling dentist can be seen along with a woman acting as his assistant.

18th century
 1740: Madeleine-Françoise Calais became the first female dentist to obtain a license as a master dentist from the Surgical Society of Paris.

 1755: A new law was established in France banning women from dental studies.

19th century
 1814: Josephine Serre became the first woman to receive a dentistry degree from the University of Tartu.  
 1852: Amalia Assur became the first female dentist in Sweden; she was given special permission from the Royal Board of Health (Kongl. Sundhetskollegiets) to practice independently as a dentist, despite the fact that the profession was not legally opened to women in Sweden before 1861.
 1855: Emeline Roberts Jones became the first woman to practice dentistry in the United States. 
 1866: Rosalie Fougelberg received a royal dispensation from Swedish King Charles XV and thus became the first woman in Sweden to officially practice dentistry since the profession had been legally opened to women in Sweden in 1861.
 1866: Lucy Hobbs Taylor became the first woman to graduate from a dental college (Ohio Dental College).
 1869: Henriette Hirschfeld-Tiburtius, born in Germany, became the first woman to take a full college course in dentistry, as Lucy Hobbs Taylor received credit for her time in dental practice before attending dental college. Henriette graduated from the Pennsylvania College of Dental Surgery in 1869.
 1874: Fanny A. Rambarger became the second American woman to earn the degree of Doctor of Dental Surgery in 1874, when she graduated from the Pennsylvania College of Dental Surgery. She worked in Philadelphia and limited her practice to women and children only.
 1881: Margaret Caro became the first woman to be listed on the Dentists' Register of New Zealand.
 1886: Margarita Chorné y Salazar became the first female dentist in Mexico.
 1888: Nicoline Møller became the first female dentist in Denmark.
 1890: Ida Rollins became the first African-American woman to earn a dental degree in the United States, which she earned from the University of Michigan.
 1892: The Women's Dental Association of the U.S. was founded in 1892 by Mary Stillwell-Kuesel with 12 charter members.
 1893: Caroline Louise Josephine Wells became the first woman to graduate from the Royal College of Dental Surgeons of Ontario, which made her the first Canadian woman to graduate from any dental school.
 1895: Lilian Lindsay became the first licensed female dentist in Britain.
 1898: Emma Gaudreau Casgrain became the first licensed female dentist in Canada.

20th century
 1904-1905: Faith Sai So Leong, also called Sai So Yeong, became the first Chinese-American woman to graduate from a school of dentistry and become a dentist in the United States. In 1904 she became the first woman of any race to graduate from the College of Physicians and Surgeons (now the University of the Pacific Arthur A. Dugoni School of Dentistry). In 1905 she was awarded the Doctor of Dental Surgery from that school, and after a trial of the State Board of Dental Examiners, which delayed the awarding of licenses, she was granted a dental license in August 1905.  
 1907: Frances Dorothy Gray became Australia’s first female Bachelor of Dental Science graduate; she graduated from the Australian College of Dentistry, University of Melbourne, in 1907.
1907: Mathilde Athenas was the first female dentist to graduate in Réunion.
 1909: Minnie Evangeline Jordon established the first dental practice in the United States devoted only to pediatric patients.
 1916: Gillette Hayden served as the first female president of the American Academy of Periodontology.
 1920: Maude Tanner became the first recorded female delegate to the American Dental Association.
 1921: During the annual meeting of the American Dental Association (ADA), 12 female dentists met in Milwaukee and formed the Federation of American Women Dentists, now known as the American Association of Women Dentists (AAWD). Their first president was Minnie Evangeline Jordon.
 1923: Anita Martin became the first woman inducted into the American dental honor society Omicron Kappa Upsilon.
 1925: Minnie Evangeline Jordon published the first textbook on pedodontics, titled Operative Dentistry for Children.
 1946: Lilian Lindsay became the first female president of the British Dental Association.
 1951: Helen E. Myers, a 1941 graduate of Temple University, was commissioned as the U.S. Army Dental Corps' first female dental officer in 1951.
 1957: Simi Johnson and Grace Guobadia both qualified as dentists in 1957, making them the first trained female dentists in Nigeria.
 1961: Etelvina González Martínez was the first woman to graduate from the School of Medicine of the Medical Sciences Campus of the University of Puerto Rico. 
 1965: Badri Teymourtash and Esmael Sondoozi founded Mashhad University’s School of Dentistry.
 1965: Fatima Nazzal became the first female dentist in Palestine upon settling in Ramallah. 
 1975: On July 1, 1975, Jeanne Sinkford became the first female dean of an American dental school when she was appointed the dean of Howard University, School of Dentistry.
 1975: Jessica Rickert became the first female American Indian dentist in America upon graduating from the University of Michigan School of Dentistry in 1975. She was a member of the Prairie Band Potawatomi Nation, and a direct descendant of the Indian chief Wahbememe (Whitepigeon).
 1977: The American Association of Dental Schools (founded in 1923 and renamed the American Dental Education Association in 2000) had Nancy Goorey as its first female president in 1977.
 1988: The American Student Dental Association elected its first female president, N. Gail McLaurin of the Medical University of South Carolina.
 1991: Geraldine Morrow became the first female president of the American Dental Association.
 1995: Anna-Lena Hallonsten became the first female president of the International Association of Paediatric Dentistry.
 1997: Hazel J. Harper became the first female president of the [American] National Dental Association.

21st century
 2001: Marjorie Jeffcoat became the first female editor of The Journal of the American Dental Association.
 2003: Rear Admiral Carol I. Turner became the first female Chief of the U.S. Navy Dental Corps.
 2004: Sandra Madison, of Asheville, North Carolina, was elected as the first female president of the American Association of Endodontists.
2004: Nikki Rubaine-Connell became the first local female dentist to practice dentistry in the British Virgin Islands after having studied abroad.
 2004: Janet Hatcher Rice became the first female president of the Academy of Laser Dentistry.
 2005: Michele Aerden became the first female president of the FDI World Dental Federation.
 2007: Laura Kelly became the first female president of the American Academy of Cosmetic Dentistry.
 2008: Beverly Largent, a pediatric dentist from Paducah, Kentucky, became the first female president of the American Academy of Pediatric Dentistry.
 2008: Valerie Murrah became the first female president of the American Academy of Oral and Maxillofacial Pathology.
 2008: Paula Jones became the first female president of the Academy of General Dentistry.
 2008: Deborah Stymiest of Fredericton was elected as the first female president of the Canadian Dental Association.
 2008: Susan Bordenave-Bishop became the first female president of the Academy of Dentistry International.
 2009: Kathleen T. O'Loughlin, of Medford, Massachusetts, became the first female executive director of the American Dental Association.
 2011: Angella Tahani, the first qualified dentist from Solomon Islands, Tikopia, began serving as a Chief Dental Officer.
 2011: Ruth Bol, a Comanche woman, became the first female president of the Society of American Indian Dentists.
 2013: Gayle Glenn was elected as the first female president of the American Association of Orthodontists.

See also
List of first women dentists by country
Women in dentistry in the United States

References

Further reading 
 100 Years of Women in the Dental Profession in the UK, 1918-2018, by Janine Brooks. Cambridge Scholars Publishing, 2019.

Dentistry-related lists
dentistry